These are the international rankings of Equatorial Guinea.

International rankings

References

Equatorial Guinea